M. Y. Eqbal (13 February 1951 – 7 May 2021) was an Indian judge. He served as Judge of Supreme Court of India. He served also as Chief Justice of the Madras High Court. He retired in February 2016.

Early life and education
He was born on 13 February 1951, passed B.Sc. examination from Ranchi University in 1970 and obtained LL.B. Degree in 1974 with Distinction (Gold Medalist).

Career
Enrolled as an Advocate in 1975 and initially practised exclusively in civil side in civil courts, Ranchi, he shifted practice to Ranchi Bench of the Patna High Court in 1986 and became Government Pleader in the Ranchi Bench of Patna High Court in 1990.

In 1993 he became Government Advocate in the High Court. In these periods he practised in civil, criminal, constitutional and tax matters. He also worked as retained Counsel and Legal Adviser of almost all the Banks, Insurance Company, Electricity Board, Housing Board, University and other Government and semi Government Undertakings. Appointed permanent Judge of the Patna High Court on 9 May 1996, by Notification dated 14 November 2000 he became the Judge of the Jharkhand High Court. He was the chief justice of the Madras High Court from 11 June 2010 to 21 December 2012 and elevated as Judge of Supreme Court of India on 24 December 2012.

His brother is also a judge in the Ranchi Lower Court.

Eqbal died from COVID-19 in May 2021, at the Medanta Hospital in the city of Gurgaon.

References

1951 births
2021 deaths
Chief Justices of the Madras High Court
20th-century Indian judges
Justices of the Supreme Court of India
People from Ranchi
21st-century Indian judges
Ranchi University alumni
Deaths from the COVID-19 pandemic in India